The Vancouver Stealth are a lacrosse team based in Vancouver, British Columbia. The team plays in the National Lacrosse League (NLL). The 2014 season was the inaugural season in Vancouver, though it was the 15th in franchise history. They previously played in Everett, Washington, San Jose, and Albany, New York.

Regular season

Current standings

Game log
Reference:

Roster

Transactions

Trades

See also
2014 NLL season

References

Vancouver
Vancouver Stealth seasons
2014 in British Columbia